Bettina Löbel (born 29 November 1962) is a retired German swimmer who competed for East Germany. 

Löbel competed at the 1980 Summer Olympics in the 100 m and 200 m breaststroke and finished in seventh place in the latter event. In 1979–1980, she won three national titles in the 200 m breaststroke and 4 × 100 m medley.

References

1952 births
Living people
Swimmers from Dresden
East German female swimmers
German female breaststroke swimmers
Olympic swimmers of East Germany
Swimmers at the 1980 Summer Olympics